Xyroptila naiwasha is a moth of the family Pterophoridae. It is found in Kenya (Lake Naiwasha).

References

External links

Moths described in 2006
Endemic moths of Kenya
naiwasha
Moths of Africa